Fifield Allen, DD(1700–1764) was Archdeacon of Middlesex from 6 May 1741 until his death on 26 April 1764.

Allen was born in Oxford and educated at Christ Church, Oxford. He was Rector of Chigwell, a Prebend of St Pancras in St Paul's Cathedral and Sub-Dean of the Chapel Royal.

Notes

18th-century English Anglican priests
Alumni of Christ Church, Oxford
Archdeacons of Middlesex
1764 deaths
1700 births